The 67th Assembly District of Wisconsin is one of 99 districts in the Wisconsin State Assembly. Located in northwest Wisconsin, the district comprises most of Chippewa County and parts of northeast Dunn County and northwest Eau Claire County. The district also contains Lake Wissota State Park and Brunet Island State Park. The district is represented by Republican Rob Summerfield, since January 2017.

The 67th Assembly district is located within Wisconsin's 23rd Senate district, along with the 68th and 69th Assembly districts.

List of past representatives

References 

Wisconsin State Assembly districts
Chippewa County, Wisconsin
Dunn County, Wisconsin